Walter Spencer (born November 11, 1978) is a former professional Canadian football linebacker. He was drafted by the Saskatchewan Roughriders in the third round of the 2004 CFL Draft. He played college football for the Indianapolis Greyhounds.

Spencer has also played for the Calgary Stampeders and the Toronto Argonauts.
Spencer is a 3 time Grey Cup Champion.
Spencer was Saskatchewan Roughriders Special Teams player of the year 2004 and 2005.
Spencer was Montreal Alouettes Special Teams player of the year 2007.

Spencer is the CEO/Founder of Top Player Athletic Training Facility in Windsor Ontario where he trains athletes of all sports and ability.
Spencer is the President of AKO Fratmen cjfl football team in Windsor Ontario.

Spencer's son, Walter III, was born in July 2011.

References

External links 
Toronto Argonauts bio

1978 births
Living people
Players of American football from Detroit
Sportspeople from Windsor, Ontario
American players of Canadian football
Canadian football linebackers
Indianapolis Greyhounds football players
Saskatchewan Roughriders players
Calgary Stampeders players
Montreal Alouettes players
Toronto Argonauts players